Thomas Robert Ruud (born July 26, 1953, in Olivia, Minnesota) is a former professional football player, a linebacker for the Buffalo Bills and Cincinnati Bengals of the NFL. At 6'3" 223 lb, he played college football for the Nebraska Cornhuskers from 1972-74.  At the 1975 NFL Draft, Ruud was selected in the first round (19th overall) by the Buffalo Bills. He played three seasons with the Bills and two with the Cincinnati Bengals.

Tom Ruud is a 1971 graduate of Jefferson High School in Bloomington, Minnesota.  His sons Barret and Bo both played football at Nebraska and were selected in the NFL Draft.

External links
NFL.com - Tom Ruud

 

People from Olivia, Minnesota
American football linebackers
Nebraska Cornhuskers football players
Buffalo Bills players
Cincinnati Bengals players
Players of American football from Minnesota
1953 births
Living people